Immofinanz (stylized as IMMOFINANZ) is a commercial real-estate company that focuses its activities on the retail and office segments of seven core markets in Europe: Austria, Germany, Czech Republic, Serbia, Slovakia, Hungary, Romania and Poland. The core business includes the management and development of properties. The company has a real estate portfolio of EUR 5.0 billion that covers approx. 210 properties, as of 31 December 2020.

As of October 2015, it is a member of the Austrian Traded Index (ATX), the index of the twenty largest companies traded on the Vienna stock exchange. as well as on the Warsaw Stock Exchange. 'Immo' is short for Immobilien, German for real estate.

History 
C & S Immobilien Anlagen Aktiengesellschaft was established in April 1990 as a joint venture company owned by Constantia Privatbank and Bankhaus Schoeller & Co. In November 1994, C & S Immobilien Anlagen Aktiengesellschaft was merged into IMMOFINANZ, which had previously been established with the name of CPAG Immobilienvermietungs GmbH, had become a public company and been renamed C & S Realitäten Anlagen Aktiengesellschaft. Following the merger with C & S Immobilien Anlagen Aktiengesellschaft, the name was changed to IMMOFINANZ IMMOBILIEN ANLAGEN AKTIENGESELLSCHAFT.

In 1991, the shares in C & S Immobilien Anlagen Aktiengesellschaft were admitted to the Second Regulated Market on the Vienna Stock Exchange, and from 1994 the shares of IMMOFINANZ. In 1996 the first capital increase was carried out and in the same year IMMOFINANZ shares were admitted to the Official Market on the Vienna Stock Exchange. In September 2006, the name was changed to IMMOFINANZ AG. In May 2013, the secondary listing of the shares on the Warsaw Stock Exchange took place.

IMMOFINANZ is present today in Austria, Germany, the Czech Republic, Slovakia, Hungary, Romania and Poland. The core business includes the asset management and development of properties. Active portfolio management and utilisation of profitable sales opportunities ensures ongoing optimisation of the standing investment portfolio. With the sale of the entire logistics portfolio, which was completed at the beginning of February 2016, IMMOFINANZ placed its strategic focus on the office and retail asset classes in its core markets.

Financial crisis 2008 
In the summer of 2008, international real estate and financial markets were rattled by loss of investor confidence and funding shortfalls. Constantia Privatbank AG (CPAG), which, under the directorship of Petrikovics and Gertner, was responsible for the management of IMMOFINANZ, failed to react to the changed circumstances.
These developments, along with poor management decisions, the correctness of which were/are the subject of criminal investigations, caused a crisis at IMMOFINANZ. In the wake of the global financial and economic crisis and the accompanying falling securities prices, IMMOFINANZ shares also came under strong pressure. For IMMOFINANZ, what was probably the most difficult phase in the history of the company up to that point began.

The company today 

As a commercial real estate company, IMMOFINANZ focuses on both the retail and office asset classes. In the office sector, the company ranks among the largest providers of space in many of the capital cities in its core markets. In Germany, IMMOFINANZ has constructed  the new corporate head offices for trivago und Uniper in Düsseldorf. The two office buildings are now part of the IMMOFINANZ standing investment portfolio.

The IMMOFINANZ brand world was expanded during 2016 financial year to also include an international office brand named myhive. Characteristic features of myhive office buildings are: hotel inspired atmosphere, versatile infrastructure, international community, cooperation opportunities and networking as well as flexibility. Currently the third office project in the Düsseldorfer Medienhafen is under construction for IMMOFINANZ's standing investment portfolio. This high-rise is designed as a multi-tenant building and will be the first office building under the IMMOFINANZ brand myhive in Germany. As of 31 December 2020, myhive has 21 locations with a total rentable space of around 491,000 sqm. The aim is to further growth with the myhive brand in the capital cities of the core countries.

In retail, the group concentrates on its two brands, STOP SHOP und VIVO!.
STOP SHOP comprises retail parks in Austria and Eastern Europe, featuring a standardised format and a tenant mix. The STOP SHOP locations are predominantly in catchment areas with 30,000 to 150,000 residents and have lettable space of 3,000 sqm to 15,000 sqm. As of 31 December 2020, there are 93 STOP SHOP locations in nine countries with a total rentable space of around 689,000 sqm. The aim is to grow to around 140 locations with the STOP SHOP retail parks over the next few years. As of 31 December 2020, there are 10 VIVO! locations in four countries with a total rentable space of around 314,000 sqm.

Immofinanz has been involved in a series of negotiations regarding a takeover or merger with its fellow ATX member CA Immo, also a property development company. Merger negotiations failed in 2014, as did an acrimonious takeover bid by CA Immo in spring 2015.

In August 2016 IMMOFINANZ has announced, that approximately 26% of the CA IMMO shares were acquired. This acquisition was a first step towards a possible full combination of IMMOFINANZ and CA Immo by way of a statutory merger. End of February 2018, the supervisory board and executive board of IMMOFINANZ decided to continue the suspension of detailed discussions over a possible merger between CA Immo and IMMOFINANZ and to also evaluate other strategic options. In July 2018, the supervisory board approved the package sale of the approximately 26% investment in CA Immo to SOF-11 Starlight S.à r.l., a member company of the Starwood Capital Group. The closing of this transaction took place on 27 September 2018.

IMMOFINANZ has held 19.5 million shares of S IMMO since September 2018.[KS1]  Following a capital increase by S IMMO in January 2020, this represents an amount of 26.5%. S IMMO is a real estate investment company with its head office in Vienna, and its shares are listed in the ATX.

Startup Investments 
In 2020 IMMOFINANZ acquired stakes in PropTech startups SpaceOS and ShareSpace, investing €2.0 and €2.5 M respectively.

Acquisition by CPI Property Group 
CPI Property Group SA acquired a majority stake in Immofinanz AG in February 2022.

References

External links 
 Vienna Stock Exchange: Market Data Immofinanz AG

Real estate companies of Austria
Companies based in Vienna
Real estate companies established in 1990